The 2015 Women's EuroHockey Club Trophy was the 39th edition of the women's Women's EuroHockey Club Trophy, Europe's secondary club field hockey tournament organized by the EHF. It was held from 21 to 24 May 2015 in Minsk, Belarus.

Hamburg won the tournament after defeating Royal Wellington  10–1 in the final. Minsk finished third, after defeating Atasport 4–1 in the third place playoff.

Teams

 Atasport
 Minsk
 Royal Wellington 
 Hamburg
 Pembroke Wanderers
 Metrostroy
 Real Sociedad
 Sumchanka

Results

Preliminary round

Pool A

Pool B

Classification round

Seventh and eighth place

Fifth and sixth place

Third and fourth place

Final

Statistics

Final standings

  Hamburg
  Royal Wellington 
  Minsk
  Atasport
  Real Sociedad
  Sumchanka
  Metrostroy
  Pembroke Wanderers

References

Club Trophy Women
EuroHockey Club Trophy
International women's field hockey competitions hosted by Belarus
Women's EuroHockey Club Trophy
EuroHockey Club Trophy
2015 in Belarusian sport
Sports competitions in Minsk
2010s in Minsk